Anatolie Urecheanu (born 21 December 1960) is a Moldovan diplomat. He is the Moldovan Ambassador to Italia.

References

Living people
1960 births
Ambassadors of Moldova to China